Roberts Wesleyan University is a private Christian university offering liberal arts and professional programs in Rochester, New York. It was the first educational institution established for Free Methodists in North America. Roberts is accredited by the Middle States Commission on Higher Education, is a member of the Association of Colleges and Universities of the State of New York, the Rochester Area Colleges, the Association of Free Methodist Educational Institutions, the Council of Independent Colleges (CIC), and the Council for Christian Colleges and Universities (CCCU).

Northeastern Seminary (NES) is a graduate school of theology located on the campus of Roberts Wesleyan University. Northeastern has been fully accredited by the Association of Theological Schools in the United States and Canada since 2003. It is also accredited by the Middle States Commission on Higher Education and approved by the New York State Board of Regents University of the State of New York.

History
Roberts Wesleyan University was originally established as Chili Seminary by Benjamin Titus Roberts in 1866. Roberts was a social activist who opposed slavery and oppression of the poor, and was a supporter of women's right to vote. He began the school to train young people to become servant leaders with high moral character. Having first used a local tavern as a school, in 1869 a three story brick building was erected. There were 56 students total that year.

In 1885, its name changed to Chesbrough Seminary in response to the $30,000 gift of benefactor A.M. Chesbrough.

In the fall of 1892 both Cox Hall and Roberts Hall were completed. Cox Hall was used as both class rooms and administration, and now houses the Department of Music and Performing Arts. The first public event held in Cox Hall was founder B.T. Roberts' funeral in 1893. Students laid a sidewalk between Cox and Roberts Hall in 1929.

Carpenter Hall was opened in 1935. It was named for Miss Adella P. Carpenter who had taught at the school from 1877 to 1916. Carpenter Hall has housed many important pieces of the campus, including the dining hall, library, and dorms. The building currently houses the Art, Social Work, and Psychology Departments.

In 1945, it was renamed Roberts Junior College in honor of B.T. Roberts, the founder of both the college and the Free Methodist Church. Four years later, it was renamed as Roberts Wesleyan College to indicate the transition to a four-year baccalaureate institution and to root itself clearly within the Wesleyan theological tradition.

In 1998, Northeastern Seminary was established as Roberts' graduate school of theology.

In 2022, it was renamed Roberts Wesleyan University in accordance with the New York State Education Board of Regents (on 9/13/22).

On January 26, 2023 it was announced that current Roberts Wesleyan University President Deanna Porterfield would conclude her work in June at the institution in Rochester, NY. She will then move on to assume the role of President at Seattle Pacific University later on in 2023.

Academics

Roberts Wesleyan University has undergraduate (60+), graduate and doctoral (16) and adult degree-completion (6) programs and online programs including hybrid options (12). Roberts also has a doctoral programs in Clinical & School Psychology and Occupational Therapy. Northeastern Seminary at Roberts Wesleyan University students can complete a Master of Arts in Theology, Master of Divinity, Doctor of Ministry degree, and several certificate programs.

Athletics

The Roberts Wesleyan athletic teams are called the Redhawks. Roberts is a member of the Division II level of the National Collegiate Athletic Association (NCAA); primarily competing in the East Coast Conference (ECC) since the 2012–13 academic year. They are also a member of the National Christian College Athletic Association (NCCAA), primarily competing as an independent in the Midwest Region of the Division I level. The Redhawks previously competed in the defunct American Mideast Conference of the National Association of Intercollegiate Athletics (NAIA) from 2001–02 to 2011–12 (when the conference dissolved).

Roberts Wesleyan competes in 16 intercollegiate varsity sports: Men's sports include basketball, cross country, lacrosse, soccer, swimming & diving and track & field (indoor and outdoor); while women's sports include basketball, bowling, cross country, lacrosse, soccer, swimming & diving, track & field (indoor and outdoor), Triathlon, and volleyball.

Move to Division II
In July 2011, Roberts was accepted into the NCAA Division II reclassification process from the NAIA to the NCAA. Roberts became a full member of NCAA Division II for the 2014–15 academic year. Roberts Wesleyan University is the first NCAA Division II school in the Greater Rochester Region.

Residence Life
Residence halls include Davison Hall, the Alumni Villages (made up of Morrow Hall, Sittig Hall, Mohnkern Hall, and Wittingham Hall), the Beeson Apartments, and fifteen townhouses, Miner Hall and The Quads (O'Brien Hall, Updyke Hall, and Magill Hall).

Notable alumni

Kirk Wagar (class of 1990), United States Ambassador to the Republic of Singapore
John Walsh (class of 1990), President of the Conservative Party of Canada
Jennifer Suhr (class of 2004), Pole Vaulter, 2012 Olympic Gold Medalist, 2008 Olympic Silver Medalist, 2013 Women's Pole Vault Champion – USA Outdoor Track and Field Championships, holder of the indoor women's pole vault world record, American women's pole vault record, holder of 15 National Titles.
Timothy Bellavia (class of 1992), Children's Author / Illustrator & Professor, Touro College
Richard Goddard, Goalkeeper, Vancouver Whitecaps
Juan Pablo Galavis (class of 2001), Former professional soccer player and contestant on The Bachelor
Sharon Sweet (class of 1974), Opera Singer, Metropolitan Opera Company & Vocal Professor, Westminster Choir College.
Daniel Bennett (class of 2002), Award winning Manhattan-based jazz bandleader and composer
Jesus Paesch (class of 2012), Former professional soccer player
Brian Kolb (class of 1996 & 1998), Former Minority Leader of the New York State Assembly
Malcolm Shaw (soccer) (class of 2017), Canadian professional soccer player, forward
Michael Cunningham (soccer) (class of 2014), English professional soccer player, forward

References

External links
 
 Official athletics website

 
Private universities and colleges in New York (state)
Universities and colleges in the United States affiliated with the Free Methodist Church
Educational institutions established in 1966
Universities and colleges in Monroe County, New York
Evangelicalism in New York (state)
1866 establishments in New York (state)
Council for Christian Colleges and Universities
Liberal arts colleges in New York (state)